The Blair Historic District is a historic district located in downtown Belleville, Illinois. The district encompasses a mainly commercial area on the west side of the downtown area; it includes 78 buildings, 57 of which are contributing buildings. The entire district is located within the original plat of the city, which was established following a land donation from George Blair in 1813. The oldest buildings in the district date to circa 1850; development continued from then on into the early twentieth century. Most buildings in the district are two-part brick commercial blocks designed in popular contemporary styles such as the Italianate, Second Empire, Classical Revival, and Romanesque Revival. The Reichert Business Block, a three-story structure at 200 West Main Street, has a particularly significant Second Empire design; the building features a mansard roof with dormers and a decorative cornice and has been described as the district's most elaborate building. Two Classical Revival buildings, the 1911 United States Post Office Building and the 1924 Turner Hall, also have a commanding presence in the district; the post office was designed by Supervising Architect James Knox Taylor.

The district was added to the National Register of Historic Places on September 18, 2015.

References

National Register of Historic Places in St. Clair County, Illinois
Buildings and structures in Belleville, Illinois
Neoclassical architecture in Illinois
Italianate architecture in Illinois
Romanesque Revival architecture in Illinois
Second Empire architecture in Illinois
Historic districts on the National Register of Historic Places in Illinois